Roy Chung (born Chung Ryeu-sup) is widely believed to be the fifth of six United States Army soldiers to have defected to North Korea after the Korean War.

Life and disappearance 
Chung and his family were South Korean immigrants who arrived in the United States in 1973. According to his father, Chung Soo-oh, he had joined the Army to get education benefits. He disappeared and was reported AWOL on June 5, 1979, while serving with his unit near Bayreuth, West Germany (about 30 miles (48 kilometers) from the borders of Czechoslovakia and East Germany). After 30 days he became classified as a deserter. He was 22 and a Private First Class.

Two months after his disappearance in Europe, North Korea's international broadcasting service Radio Pyongyang (now Voice of Korea) announced his defection, stating that he "could no longer endure the disgraceful life of national insult and maltreatment he had to lead in the U.S. imperialist aggressor Army."

The other five men who disappeared into North Korea did so by directly crossing the Korean Demilitarized Zone.

In 2004, filmmaker Nicholas Bonner (co-creator of the documentary Crossing the Line) reported that he heard Chung had died of natural causes.

Claims of abduction 
Chung's family and Korean-American groups believed that he had been abducted and was not a defector, as widely believed. They compared his disappearance to several documented abductions by North Korean agents, most notably the kidnapping of actress Choi Eun-hee.

Officials of the United States Department of State and the Pentagon at the time stated that they had no reason to doubt North Korea's claims of defection. They made no major inquiries into the matter because Chung had no access to classified information and was not a security threat.

See also
 List of American and British defectors in the Korean War: the 21 Americans and 1 Briton who refused repatriation during Operation Big Switch in 1953 (to remain in China).
 Larry Allen Abshier (1943–1983) of Urbana, Illinois, deserted in May 1962 at age 19.
 James Joseph Dresnok (1941–2016) of Richmond, Virginia, deserted in August 1962 at age 21.
 Jerry Wayne Parrish (1944–1998) of Morganfield, Kentucky, deserted in December 1963 at age 19.
 Charles Robert Jenkins (1940–2017) of Rich Square, North Carolina, deserted in January 1965 at age 24.
 Joseph T. White (1961–1985) of St Louis, Missouri, deserted in August 1982 at age 20.

Notes

External links 
Department of Defense article mentioning Pfc. Chung
 North Korea: a guide to economic and political developments

1957 births
Year of birth uncertain
2004 deaths
Year of death uncertain
American defectors
American expatriates in North Korea
United States Army soldiers
South Korean emigrants to the United States